The Trouble with Normal is an American comedy series that originally aired on ABC from October 6 to November 3, 2000. The show starred David Krumholtz, Brad Raider, Jon Cryer, Larry Joe Campbell, and Paget Brewster.

Overview
The show was described as "the misadventures of four paranoid young men whose fear of urban conspiracy leads them to seek counseling in a therapy group run by therapist Claire Garletti." Recurring members of the therapy group were played by Jim Beaver and Patricia Belcher.

Cast

 David Krumholtz as Bob Wexler
 Brad Raider as Max Perch
 Jon Cryer as Zack Mango
 Larry Joe Campbell as Stansfield Schlick
 Paget Brewster as Claire Garletti

Production
A total of thirteen episodes of the series were ordered by ABC and completed. It was one of four series planned in order to reformat the network's Friday night block from the family sitcoms of the "TGIF" era to a more adult direction, including a marketing tie-in with KFC to feature the shows in the new Friday night lineup on the chicken chain's packaging. However, the network aired only five of those episodes in the United States before the series was canceled. All thirteen episodes were later aired in Australia.

The series was originally titled People Who Fear People.  Director James Burrows was involved in the initial project but did not participate in the retitled series. Original cast members Maria Pitillo and Mackenzie Astin were replaced by Paget Brewster and Brad Raider.

Episodes

References

External links

 

2000s American sitcoms
2000 American television series debuts
2000 American television series endings
Television shows set in New York City
English-language television shows
Television series by ABC Studios
Television series by CBS Studios
Television series created by Victor Fresco